Fleischman or Fleischmann may refer to:

 Fleischmann (surname), including a list of people with the name
 Fleischmann (model railroads), a German company that produces model railroad models and equipment
 Fleischmann (band), was a band from Germany that pioneered (amongst others) the Neue Deutsche Härte style

See also
 Fleischmanns, New York, a village located in Delaware County
 Fleischmann's Vodka, gin, and whiskey
 Fleischmann's Yeast, a brand of yeast sold to both consumer and industrial markets in the United States and Canada 
 Fleischmann's Egg Beaters, a healthy egg substitute
 The Fleischmann Choir, formed in 1992, named after Aloys Fleischmann
 Fleischmann–Pons experiment, concerning cold fusion